The 2003–04 season was the 85th season in the history of Hamburger SV and the club's second consecutive season in the top flight of German football. In addition to the domestic league, Hamburger SV participated in this season's edition of the DFB-Pokal.

Competitions

Overall record

Bundesliga

League table

Results summary

Results by round

Matches

DFB-Pokal

References

Hamburger SV seasons
Hamburger SV